Sacalia is a genus of turtles in the family Geoemydidae (formerly called Bataguridae). The genus was erected by John Edward Gray in 1870.
The Sacalia is native to Southereastern China, Laos, and Vietnam. It was declared an endangered species of turtle by the IUCN Red List due to its illegal trade.
The sacalia has a carapace of dark-brown color that permits it to camouflage to its habitat. They are believed to select the area of a river that better matches their color.

Species
Two species are recognized.
 Sacalia bealei, Beale's eyed turtle or Beale's four-eyed turtle
 Sacalia quadriocellata, four-eyed turtle

Hybridization
What was described as a new species, Sacalia pseudocellata, Chinese false-eyed turtle, is actually a hybrid of a male Cuora trifasciata and a female Sacalia quadriocellata.

References

Further reading
 Gray, John Edward (1870). Supplement to the Catalogue of Shield Reptiles in the Collection of the British Museum. Part I. Testudinata (Tortoises). With Figures of the Skulls of 36 Genera. London: Trustees of the British Museum. (Taylor and Francis). x + 120 pp. (Genus Sacalia, p. 35).

 
Turtle genera
Taxa named by John Edward Gray
Taxonomy articles created by Polbot